Playground Poker Club is a poker cardroom and casino located in Kahnawake, Quebec, Canada.

Features
The casino opened in 2010 and focuses on poker. It offers 75 poker tables in an area over 128,000 square feet. In addition to poker, the casino also has slot machines.

Playground Poker hosted the partypoker Premier League in 2013. The Premier League VII hosted at the cardroom was won by Sorel Mizzi who took down $466,000 in the process. The cardroom also hosted several World Series of Poker circuit events such as Season IV of the WSOP International Circuit.

In 2017, Playground Poker hosted World Cup of Cards. The event is expected to return to the cardroom in 2019.

Two bad beat jackpot with a prizepool of over $1 million were hit at the casino. In August 2017, a jackpot of $1,210,989 was hit. The loser of the hand received $460,149, the winner received $230,088 and the rest of the table received $32,870. In April 2018, a jackpot of over $1,375,000 was hit. The loser of the hand received $522,622, the winner $261,311, and the rest of the table received $37,328.

See also 
 Expo 67
 Québec Pavilion
 Montreal Casino
 Parc Jean-Drapeau
 List of casinos in Canada

References

External links 

 

Buildings and structures in Montreal
Casinos in Quebec
Tourist attractions in Montreal